Bendavis is an unincorporated community in western Texas County, Missouri, United States. It is located approximately thirteen miles west of Houston on Route 38.

A post office called Bendavis was established in 1907, and remained in operation until 1992. The community is named after the Ben Davis variety of apple.

References

Populated places established in 1910
Unincorporated communities in Texas County, Missouri
Unincorporated communities in Missouri